Caradrina atrostriga is a species of cutworm or dart moth in the family Noctuidae. It was first described by William Barnes and James Halliday McDunnough in 1912 and it is found in North America.

The MONA or Hodges number for Caradrina atrostriga is 9659.

References

Further reading

 
 
 

Caradrinini
Articles created by Qbugbot
Moths described in 1912